Hampden is an unincorporated community in Mingo County, West Virginia, United States. Hampden had a post office, which closed on November 2, 2002.

References

Unincorporated communities in Mingo County, West Virginia
Unincorporated communities in West Virginia